Richard Thomas Baker (1 December 1854 – 14 July 1941) was an Australian economic botanist, museum curator and educator.

Early life
Baker was born in Woolwich, England, son of Richard Thomas Baker, a blacksmith, and his wife Sarah, née Colkett.  The boy was educated at Woolwich National School and Peterborough Training Institution, later gaining science and art certificates from South Kensington Museum.

He was engaged as a senior assistant-master by the School Board for London in 1875 but resigned in July 1879 to emigrate to Australia.

Career in Australia
Baker arrived in Australia in September 1879 and joined the staff of Newington College, Sydney, as science and art master in June 1880.

On 15 January 1888 Baker was appointed assistant curator to Joseph Henry Maiden at the Technological Museum, and in 1901 succeeded Maiden as curator and economic botanist. In 1902 Baker published an important work, A Research on the Eucalypts especially in regard to their essential oils, prepared in collaboration with Henry George Smith, second and enlarged edition, 1920.

Baker published a small book, Building and Ornamental Stones of New South Wales (1908), and, again in collaboration with Henry Smith, another valuable piece of research, A Research on the Pines of Australia (1910). In 1913 Cabinet Timbers of Australia appeared, and in 1915 two more books Building and Ornamental Stones of Australia, and Australian Flora in Applied Art. An important work, The Hardwoods of Australia and their Economics, was published with many illustrations in 1919. Baker retired from the Technological Museum on 30 June 1921. With H. G. Smith he published Woodfibres of Some Australian Timbers (1924).

Baker was lecturer on forestry at the University of Sydney 1913–1925, was a member of the Royal and Linnean Societies of New South Wales, and published over 100 papers in their journals. He was a member of the council of the Linnean Society 1897–1922.

Later life and legacy
Baker was awarded the von Mueller medal by the Australian and New Zealand Association for the Advancement of Science in 1921, and the Clarke Medal of the Royal Society of New South Wales in 1922. He collected both old and modern china and in 1938 joined the Royal Australian Historical Society. Baker died at Cheltenham, New South Wales on 14 July 1941 and was buried in Rookwood Cemetery.

Selected publications

See also
Taxa named by Richard Thomas Baker

References

1854 births
1941 deaths
20th-century Australian botanists
Staff of Newington College
19th-century Australian botanists